The JLP-40 is a tactical air defense radar designed to use with height finding radars such as the JLG-43 Radar. It is similar in design to the Russian "Bar Lock" series radar and may have been derived from it as part of the sale of the SA-2 system from the Former Soviet Union in the early 1960s.  It features the same arrangement of the two large scanners attached to front and ear sides of a rotating cabin that houses the transmitter/receivers.

Operating modes 

The system operates in S-band and L-band, each parabolic scanner being illuminated by stacked horn feeds to generate families of multiple beams.  There are five  S-band transmitter/receivers and these are thought to operate with the lower of the two antennas, while the L-band feeds illuminate the upper scanner array. An IFF interrogator is incorporated in the system. Three PPI displays are available, one azimuth/range display and two to four additional PPI.  MTI is provided in the L - band modules. 

The whole system is air transportable but requires considerable time and effort to assemble/disassemble. It is being produced by the Chengdu Jin Jiang Electronic System Engineering Company.

Specifications 
 S / L - bands
 Range: 270 km
 Height: 20,000 metres
 Azimuth coverage: 360°
 Elevation coverage: 0.5°-30°
 Accuracy: 500 metre (range) +/- 0.5° (bearing)

External links
 Jin Jiang Electronic System Engineering Company

Ground radars
Military radars of the People's Republic of China